was a Japanese daimyō of the Edo period who served the Tokugawa clan. He was also known as Ii Naotsugu. His childhood name was Manchiyo (万千代). Naokatsu succeeded to family headship following his father's death in 1602. Under Tokugawa Ieyasu's orders, Naokatsu completed construction of Hikone Castle in 1606, and then moved there from Sawayama Castle when it was largely completed. In 1614, as Naokatsu was ill, he sent his brother Naotaka to fight in the Siege of Osaka; Naokatsu himself was assigned to Annaka, where he undertook security duty in the Kantō region. After the siege of Osaka, Tokugawa Ieyasu rewarded Naokatsu's younger brother Naotaka with the Ii family headship, and allowed Naokatsu to form a branch family with holdings at the fief of Annaka in Kōzuke Province, worth 30,000 koku. Naokatsu retired in 1632, yielding headship to his son Naoyoshi. He died in Ōmi Province in 1662.

His descendants were moved around several times before having their holdings settle at Itoigawa, in Echigo Province.

Family
 Father: Ii Naomasa
 Mother: Tobai-in
 Wives:
 Torii Tadamasa’s daughter
 Nakazima Shinzaemon's daughter
 Children:
 Ii Naoyoshi by Nakazima Shinzaemon's daughter
 daughter married Ii Naoshige

Title

|-

References
 "Annaka-han" on Edo 300 HTML (6 July 2008)
Naramoto Tatsuya (1992). Nihon no kassen: Monoshiri jiten. (Tokyo:Shufu-to-seikatsusha).

1590 births
1662 deaths
Fudai daimyo
Ii clan